Brookefield is a neighbourhood of Bangalore. Established in the late 19th century as a settlement for the Eurasians of Bangalore. It is a wealthy area, with high real estate prices and relatively new commercial roads such as ITPL road.   

IT Companies like IBM, SAP have their offices here. It is a busy place in Bangalore.  
 
Brookefield is now officially part of Bangalore city which is a Part of the BBMP (Bruhat Bengaluru Mahanagara Palike).

Surrounding area near Brookefield
 Pattandur agrahara
 Nellurhalli
 Varthur
 Immadihalli
 Vinayakanagara (Previously known as Dhanamandi)
 Hagadur
 Harohalli
 Kadugodi (Location of the Sai Baba ashram and the Whitefield railway Station)
 Kundalahalli
 Belathur
 Segehalli
 Kannamangala
 Ramagondanahalli
 Nagondanahalli
 Siddapura
 Channasandra
 Samethanahalli
 Bodhanahosahally
 Thathanur
 Seetharampalya
 Belathur
 Sadaramangala
 Hoodi
 Vijayanagar
 Gandhipuram
 Marathahalli

Infrastructure
Brookefield has started seeing a boom in residential construction since the latter half of the 1990s and especially during 2002 and onwards. A major four-lane road (Varthur Road) connects Bangalore city with Brookefield.

Brookefield also has extensive city bus connectivity with a wide range of services offered by BMTC. A Traffic and Transit Management Centre (TTMC) in EPIP is now functional with schedules connecting it with most areas of the city.

BMTC bus route numbers
To Kempegowda Bus Terminus: 333E, 320A, 333K, 333P, 335EP
To Shivajinagar Bus Stand: 320, 320F, 331, 331C, 331E, 339, 339E
To K.R.Market: 319A, 320C, 322, 324, 324A, 326C, 326E.
To Hoskote: 326E, 328B, 328H

However, Brookefield suffers from water shortage especially during summer months as the whole region relies almost entirely on groundwater. With the increase in housing and office space, the demand has been multiplying over the years and groundwater depletion has been worsening alarmingly. BWSSB is expected to supply the region with the execution of Cauvery Water Supply Scheme Stage IV, Phase II. BWSSB has been granted ₹1000 crore for various water projects in 2012 including supplying water to areas of Greater Bangalore which includes Brooke Field.

Geographic Location

References

External links

Neighbourhoods in Bangalore